Petti Amba (පෙට්‍ටි අඹ) is a species of plant in the Mangifera (mango) genius of the family Anacardiaceae. It is now extreme rare and is called Petti Amba in Sinhala meaning 'Box Mango'. Petti Amba might be native or endemic to Sri Lanka.

References 

Mangifera
Mango cultivars